Little Dog Mountain is located in the Lewis Range, Glacier National Park in the U.S. state of Montana. Little Dog Mountain sits along the Continental Divide and can be easily seen from Marias Pass. The mountain was named by George Bird Grinnell for "Little Dog," Blackfoot Indian Chief who, in 1853, informed Isaac Stevens, the new Governor of the Washington Territory, of the existence of Marias Pass.

See also
 Mountains and mountain ranges of Glacier National Park (U.S.)

References

Little Dog Mountain
Mountains of Glacier National Park (U.S.)
Lewis Range
Mountains of Montana